Curculio is a genus of weevils belonging the family Curculionidae and subfamily Curculioninae. Members of the genus are commonly referred to as acorn weevils or nut weevils as they infest the seeds of trees such as oaks and hickories. The adult female weevil bores a tiny hole in the immature nut to lay her eggs, which then hatch into legless grubs. In autumn, the grubs bore holes through the shells from the inside to emerge into the soil where they may live for a year or two before maturing into adults.

Species
Species of Curculio include:

See also
 Curculigo

References

External links

 Emergence of fully grown Curculio larva from acorn
 Genus Curculio - Nut and Acorn Weevils

Curculioninae
Curculionidae genera
Beetles described in 1758
Taxa named by Carl Linnaeus